The 2008–09 SLC Super Provincial Twenty20 is the 2nd season of the official Twenty20 domestic cricket competition in Sri Lanka. Six teams in total, five representing four provinces of Sri Lanka and a Sri Lanka Schools XI team participating in the competition. The competition began on 25 March 2009when Ruhuna elevens played the Sri Lanka Schools XI at Moors Sports Club Ground, Colombo.

This season comprised 15 regular matches, two semi finals and a grand final.

Teams

Stadiums

Rules and regulations 

Teams received 4 points for a win, 2 for a tie or no result, and 0 for a loss. At the end of the regular matches the teams ranked two and three play each other in the preliminary final. The winner of the preliminary final earns the right to play the first placed team in the final at the home venue of the first placed team. In the event of several teams finishing with the same number of points, standings are determined by most wins, then net run rate (NRR). All finals were played at Sinhalese Sports Club Ground.

Standings and tournament progression

Standings 

Full table on cricinfo
(C) = Eventual Champion; (R) = Runner-up.
Winner qualify for the 2009 Champions League Twenty20.

Tournament progression

Fixtures

Round 1

Round 2

Round 3

Round 4

Round 5

Knockout stage

Semi Final 1

Semi Final 2

Final

Statistics

Most Runs 
The top five highest run scorers (total runs) in the season are included in this table.

Last Updated 31 March 2010.

Most Wickets 
The following table contains the five leading wicket-takers of the season.

Last Updated 31 March 2010.

Highest Team Totals 
The following table lists the six highest team scores during this season.

Last Updated 31 March 2010.

Highest Scores 
This table contains the top five highest scores of the season made by a batsman in a single innings.

Last Updated 31 March 2010.

Best Bowling Figures in an innings 
This table lists the top five players with the best bowling figures in an innings.

Last Updated 31 March 2010.

References

External links 
 Tournament Page – Cricinfo

Domestic cricket competitions in 2008–09
Inter-Provincial Twenty20
2008 in Sri Lankan cricket
2009 in Sri Lankan cricket